Huayue Sanniang, also known as Sanshengmu, is a Chinese goddess who possesses a magical lotus lantern. She is a goddess of marriage and love in the Chinese folk religion.

Legends 
According to a legend, Huayue Sanniang is the daughter of the Emperor Xiyue (西岳大帝), one of the Great Emperors of Five Mountains. At the foot of Mount Hua, the Xiyue Temple was built for Emperor Xiyue. Sanniang is enshrined in the Sanniang Hall of the Partial Hall of the Xiyue Temple.

The Magic Lotus Lantern
According to the Tang dynasty folk tale The Magic Lotus Lantern, she is the daughter of Yang Tianyou, a mortal and Yaoji, a goddess in the Heavenly Palace who is the younger sister of the Jade Emperor. 

One day, she  fell in love with a mortal scholar, Liu Yanchang. But their love was strongly opposed by her elder brother Yang Jian (Erlang Shen). With the help of the magic lotus lantern, she defeated her brother and married the scholar. Later she gave birth to a son, Chen Xiang. After seven years Erlang Shen was able to locate the couple by the light of the magical lotus lantern. Erlang Shen then denies the marriage and punishes her by imprisoning under Mount Hua for her crimes. 

After Chen Xiang grew up, he learns of how his mother was imprisoned and determines to go to Mount Hua and rescue his mother. Chen Xiang encounters many trials during his journey. He learned martial arts skills from Daxian Pili or Lü Dongbin. After Chen Xiang defeated his uncle, he split open Mount Hua with his magical axe and rescued his mother, reuniting his family.

Influence

Films
Save Mother from Mountain (小英雄劈山救母), a 1928 Chinese film
Breaking Open the Mountain to Rescue Mother (劈山救母), a 1950 Hong Kong film
The Precious Lotus Lamp (寶蓮燈), a 1956 Hong Kong Cantonese opera film
The Precious Lotus Lamp, Part II (1957)
The Precious Lotus Lamp, Part III (1958)
The Magic Lotus Lantern (寶蓮燈), a 1959 Chinese film
Breaking Open the Mountain to Rescue Mother (劈山救母), a 1961 Taiwanese film
The Lotus Lamp (七彩寶蓮燈), a 1963 Hong Kong Cantonese opera film
The Magic Lamp (寶蓮燈), a 1964 Hong Kong Huangmei opera film
The Lotus Lamp (寶蓮燈), a 1965 Hong Kong film
The Magic Lotus Lantern (寶蓮燈), a 1976 Hebei bangzi film

Animation films
Saving Mother (西嶽奇童), a 1984 Chinese film
Lotus Lantern, a 1999 Chinese film
Chen Xiang (西嶽奇童), a 2006 Chinese film
New Gods: Yang Jian,  a popular Chinese animation

TV series
The Lamp Lore (寶蓮燈), a 1986 Hong Kong TV series
The Polien Lantern (天地傳說之寶蓮燈), a 2001 Chinese-Taiwanese TV series
Lotus Lantern, a 2005 Chinese TV series
Prelude of Lotus Lantern (2009)

References

 Chinese deities
 Chinese goddesses